Men, Women & Children is a 2014 American comedy-drama film directed by Jason Reitman and co-written with Erin Cressida Wilson, based on a novel of the same name written by Chad Kultgen that deals with online addiction. The film stars Rosemarie DeWitt, Jennifer Garner, Judy Greer, Dean Norris, Adam Sandler, Ansel Elgort, Kaitlyn Dever and Timothée Chalamet.

The film premiered at the 2014 Toronto International Film Festival on September 6, 2014. The film was released on October 3, 2014 by, Paramount Pictures.

Plot
Set in a small town in Texas, this film follows several teens and their parents as they struggle in today's technology-obsessed world. Their communication, self-images and relationships are all affected by the technological age, compounding the usual social difficulties people already encounter. These are video game culture, anorexia, infidelity, fame hunting, and the massive abundance of illicit material available on the internet. Each character and relationship are put to the test.

Donald and Helen Truby are a sexually dissatisfied married couple. She starts having multiple affairs through the social media website Ashley Madison, and he regularly sees escorts through another site. Donald accidentally catches sight of his wife's website, then shows up where she's meeting her latest affair. In a discussion the day after this discovery, both admit to having indiscretions and agree to ignore they ever happened. The Trubys' teenage son Chris, a football player, is aroused by online material not deemed "normal" by society. Hoping to have arousal by "traditional means", Chris tries to date cheerleader and classmate Hannah. However, as they start to initiate sex, he fails to become aroused, so she tells everyone they did anyway and then breaks up with him.

Hannah and her mother Donna come across auditions for a television series one day in the mall. She's ecstatic as her dream is to become famous, but because her mom had showcased her very provocatively on her website, Hannah is disqualified for the show. Later on, Donna takes the website down, realizing her daughter's activity on the site is damaging to Hannah.

Tim, a football player, quits to play a MMORPG following his parents' divorce. He gains a reason for living after dating the introverted Brandy Beltmeyer, who expresses herself on a secret Tumblr account. The account and Tim's online conversations are discovered by her overprotective mother Patricia, who removes her daughter's online privileges. Tim's father Kent, noticing lewd comments about a Facebook picture of Tim's mother on his game, confronts him and states she abandoned both of them. He deletes the game and demands Tim play football next year, causing him to get down. Patricia then poses as Brandy and messages to Tim that she is uninterested. Dejected, Tim overdoses on his antidepressants and nearly dies, which makes Patricia realise her monitoring has gone too far, and she deactivates the surveillance device she used to monitor Brandy.

Donna goes to content awareness meetings run by Patricia to learn about what is legally allowed on her daughter's website. There she meets Kent and starts a relationship with him. After Donna informs him about the website, he initially wants to end the relationship. However, after reconciling with Tim and realizing how difficult it is to be a single parent, Kent reconnects with her.

Hannah's co-cheerleader Allison Doss has been starving herself for months over the summer, with the support of an online group. For years she has had a crush on Brandon Lender, a football player, and he finally notices her. Excited, she secretly shares her first kiss with him, and later sex on his insistence, and he treats it casually and with disinterest. Allison develops an ectopic pregnancy, and she miscarries a short time later. Rushed to the hospital, both she and her parents learn about it. Brandon's only concern is about others discovering they had sex. Realizing how selfish Brandon is, Allison throws a rock through his window in the middle of the night.

We are left with the overall message that humans should remember to be kind to one another.

Cast

 Emma Thompson (voice) as the narrator
 Rosemarie DeWitt as Helen Truby
 Jennifer Garner as Patricia Beltmeyer
 Judy Greer as Donna Clint
 Dean Norris as Kent Mooney
 Adam Sandler as Don Truby
 Ansel Elgort as Tim Mooney
 Kaitlyn Dever as Brandy Beltmeyer
 J. K. Simmons as Mr. Doss
 David Denman as Jim Vance
 Jason Douglas as Ray Beltmeyer
 Shane Lynch as Angelique
 Dennis Haysbert as Secretluvur
 Phil LaMarr as Shrink
 Olivia Crocicchia as Hannah Clint
 Elena Kampouris as Allison Doss
 Travis Tope as Chris Truby
 Tina Parker as Mrs. Doss
 Will Peltz as Brandon Lender
 Kurt Krakowian as Teacher
 Timothée Chalamet as Danny Vance  
 Katherine Hughes as Brooke Benton
 Intern AJ as Football Player (uncredited)

Production
By September 4, 2013, Jason Reitman had cast Adam Sandler, Rosemarie DeWitt and Jennifer Garner in the lead roles. By December 16, Emma Thompson, Judy Greer and Dean Norris were cast. The young cast includes Ansel Elgort, Kaitlyn Dever, Elena Kampouris, Travis Tope, Katherine Hughes, Olivia Crocicchia, and Timothée Chalamet. Other stars are David Denman, Jason Douglas, Dennis Haysbert, Shane Lynch, and J. K. Simmons. Will Peltz also joined the cast, on December 17. Principal photography began on December 16, 2013, in and around Austin, Texas.

Reception

Box office
Men, Women & Children premiered at the 2014 Toronto International Film Festival on September 6, 2014. The film opened in limited release on October 3, 2014 in 17 theaters and grossed $48,024 with an average of $2,825 per theater and ranking #48 at the box office. In its wide release on October 17 in 608 theaters the film grossed $306,367 with an average of $504 per theater and ranking #23, making it the fifth lowest opening in a release of 600 theaters or more. The film ultimately earned $705,908 in the United States and  $1,534,627 internationally for a total of $2,240,535 worldwide, well below its $16 million production budget.

Critical response
The film received a "rotten" score of 33% on Rotten Tomatoes based on 139 reviews with an average rating of 4.90/10. The critical consensus states: "Men, Women & Children is timely, but director Jason Reitman's overbearing approach to its themes blunts the movie's impact." The film also has a score of 38 out of 100 on Metacritic based on 36 critics, indicating "generally unfavorable reviews". Film critic Robbie Collin felt Men, Women & Children "played like a spoof" with others agreeing the film was "mawkish and clichéd".

References

External links
 
 
 
 Men Women and Children at I Love Film

2014 films
2015 comedy-drama films
American comedy-drama films
Films about computing
Films about the Internet
Films about social media
Films about sexuality
2010s English-language films
Films directed by Jason Reitman
Films based on American novels
Films shot in Austin, Texas
Paramount Pictures films
Films produced by Mason Novick
Films produced by Jason Reitman
Films with screenplays by Jason Reitman
2010s American films